Patsy is a 1921 American silent comedy film directed by John McDermott and starring Zasu Pitts, Marjorie Daw and Wallace Beery.

Plot

Cast
 Zasu Pitts as Patsy
 John MacFarlane as Pops
 Tom Gallery as Bob Brooks
 Marjorie Daw as Margaret Vincent
 Fanny Midgley as Mrs. Vincent
 Wallace Beery as Gustave Ludermann
 Harry Todd as Tramp
 Milla Davenport as Matron
 Henry Fortson as Bones

References

Bibliography
 Charles Stumpf. ZaSu Pitts: The Life and Career. McFarland, 2010.

External links
 
 
 
 

1921 films
1921 comedy films
1920s English-language films
American silent feature films
Silent American comedy films
American black-and-white films
Films directed by John McDermott
1920s American films